= Briertone =

Briertone was a band from the Central Coast of California. They combined indie, Southern rock and bluegrass elements to create a musical style that they referred to as "outlaw rock." The band formed in 2002 and ceased in around 2013.

Their first three of EPs were released on independent label Something Sacred Recordings. Their fourth EP, "Sky's Torn Open" was released independently on October 14, 2011.

== Band members ==
- Adam Pasion - vocals, guitar, mandolin, fiddle
- Matt Black - guitar, vocals
- Elijah Merritt - banjo, keys, guitar, mandolin, vocals
- Bobby Lucy - drums, vocals
- Robbie English - bass

== Former members ==
- Taylor Odenwald - bass, guitar, banjo
- Lane Biermann - drums
- Roger Tompkins - bass
- Gabe Munoz - bass
- Chris Nielsen - guitar, vocals, mandolin.
- Caleb Ralph - bass, vocals
- Kurtis Heck - guitar
- Mike Newsom - bass
- Aaron Wick - drums
- Addison Francisco - guitar, vocals
- Cory O'Keefe - drums
- Brandon Gatlin - keys, pedal steel
- Andrew Redel - bass
- Emily Wilson - vocals, keys

== Discography ==
- Tumbleweed EP (2003)
- Confessions Of The Wicked EP(2004)
- Sojourners EP (2006)
- Sky's Torn Open EP (2011)
